Heinrich Bamberger may refer to:
Heinrich von Bamberger (1822–1888), Austrian pathologist
Henri Bamberger (born Heinrich Bamberger, 1826–1908), banker, member of the Bischoffsheim family